The Lemon Wond Holt House at 3704 Anuhea Street in Honolulu, Hawaii, belonged to Lemon Wond Holt, nicknamed “Rusty” (22 September 1904 – 12 March 1999), one of the last surviving local-born members of the “Stonewall Gang” who frequented Waikiki Beach during the early 1900s.

Architecturally, the house is significant as one of the first examples of a "modestly detailed, fantasy picturesque style residence" built in Hawaii during the late 1920s and early 1930s. It is entirely typical for that period—in its materials, methods, craftsmanship, and design—and is one of only a dozen or so such homes that still survive in Honolulu.

References

Houses on the National Register of Historic Places in Hawaii
American Craftsman architecture in Hawaii
History of Oahu
Surfing in Hawaii
Houses in Honolulu County, Hawaii
Surfing in the United States
National Register of Historic Places in Honolulu County, Hawaii
1920s establishments in Hawaii
Houses completed in the 20th century